Department S may refer to:

 Department S (band), a British post-punk/new wave band
 Department S (TV series), a British television detective mystery series